Regional elections were held in France on 16 March 1986. At stake were the presidencies of each of France's 26 régions, which, although lacking legislative autonomy, manage sizeable budgets. The parliamentary right, led by the conservative Rally for the Republic and the centre-right Union for French Democracy won a landslide, winning 20 of 22 metropolitan regional presidencies. The Socialists only won the Limousin and the Nord-Pas de Calais region.

The election was held using a one-round proportional system (with a 5% threshold).

External links
Election-Politique Regional Elections since 1986 (in french)

1986
French Regional Elections